This is a list of algebraic number theory topics.

Basic topics
These topics are basic to the field, either as prototypical examples, or as basic objects of study.
Algebraic number field
Gaussian integer, Gaussian rational
Quadratic field
Cyclotomic field
Cubic field
Biquadratic field
Quadratic reciprocity
Ideal class group
Dirichlet's unit theorem
Discriminant of an algebraic number field
Ramification (mathematics)
Root of unity
Gaussian period

Important problems
Fermat's Last Theorem
Class number problem for imaginary quadratic fields
Stark–Heegner theorem
Heegner number
Langlands program

General aspects
Different ideal
Dedekind domain
Splitting of prime ideals in Galois extensions
Decomposition group
Inertia group
Frobenius automorphism
Chebotarev's density theorem
Totally real field
Local field
p-adic number
p-adic analysis
Adele ring
Idele group
Idele class group
Adelic algebraic group
Global field
Hasse principle
Hasse–Minkowski theorem
Galois module
Galois cohomology
Brauer group

Class field theory
Class field theory
Abelian extension
Kronecker–Weber theorem
Hilbert class field
Takagi existence theorem
Hasse norm theorem
Artin reciprocity
Local class field theory

Iwasawa theory
Iwasawa theory
Herbrand–Ribet theorem
Vandiver's conjecture
Stickelberger's theorem
Euler system
p-adic L-function

Arithmetic geometry
Arithmetic geometry
Complex multiplication
Abelian variety of CM-type
Chowla–Selberg formula
Hasse–Weil zeta function

Mathematics-related lists